Kolín District is a district in the Central Bohemian Region of the Czech Republic. Its capital is the town of Kolín.

Administrative division
Kolín District is divided into two administrative districts of municipalities with extended competence: Kolín and Český Brod.

List of municipalities
Towns are marked in bold and market towns in italics:

Barchovice -
Bečváry -
Bělušice -
Břežany I -
Břežany II -
Býchory -
Cerhenice -
Černíky -
Červené Pečky -
Český Brod -
Chotutice -
Choťovice -
Chrášťany -
Církvice -
Dobřichov -
Dolní Chvatliny -
Dománovice -
Doubravčice -
Drahobudice -
Grunta -
Horní Kruty -
Hradešín -
Jestřabí Lhota -
Kbel -
Klášterní Skalice -
Klučov -
Kolín -
Konárovice -
Kořenice -
Kouřim -
Krakovany -
Křečhoř -
Krupá -
Krychnov -
Kšely -
Libenice -
Libodřice -
Lipec -
Lošany -
Malotice -
Masojedy -
Mrzky -
Nebovidy -
Němčice -
Nová Ves I -
Ohaře -
Ovčáry -
Pašinka -
Pečky -
Plaňany -
Pňov-Předhradí -
Polepy -
Polní Chrčice -
Polní Voděrady -
Poříčany -
Přehvozdí -
Přistoupim -
Přišimasy -
Radim -
Radovesnice I -
Radovesnice II -
Ratboř -
Ratenice -
Rostoklaty -
Skvrňov -
Starý Kolín -
Svojšice -
Tatce -
Tismice -
Toušice -
Třebovle -
Tři Dvory -
Tuchoraz -
Tuklaty -
Týnec nad Labem -
Uhlířská Lhota -
Veletov -
Velim -
Velký Osek -
Veltruby -
Vitice -
Volárna -
Vrátkov -
Vrbčany -
Žabonosy -
Zalešany -
Zásmuky -
Ždánice -
Žehuň -
Žiželice

Geography

The district is located in a agricultural and deforested landscape, which is mostly flat and belongs to the Polabí region. The territory extends into three geomorphological mesoregions: Central Elbe Table (most of the territory), Upper Sázava Hills (southeastern part) and East Elbe Table (small northeastern part).

The most important river is the Elbe, however, the longest river within the territory is the Výrovka. Short section of the Klejnárka River before its confluence with the Elbe is also located in the district.

There are no large-scale protected areas.

Demographics

Most populated municipalities

Economy
The largest employers with its headquarters in Kolín District and at least 500 employers are:

Transport
The D11 motorway from Prague to Hradec Králové passes through the northern part of the district.

Sights

The most important monuments in the district, protected as national cultural monuments, are:
Church of Saint Bartholomew in Kolín
Town fortifications in Kouřim

The best-preserved settlements and archaeological sites, protected as monument reservations and monument zones, are:
Kolín (monument reservation)
Tumuli near Libodřice (monument reservation)
Český Brod
Kouřim
Týnec nad Labem

Notes

References

External links

Kolín District profile on the Czech Statistical Office's website

 
Districts of the Czech Republic